The Diocese of Rockhampton  (also known as Anglican Church Central Queensland) is a diocese of the Anglican Church of Australia, founded in 1892. It is situated in the central part of the state of Queensland, Australia. It is part of the Province of Queensland. The cathedral church of the diocese is St Paul's Cathedral in Rockhampton.

On 18 July 2020, Peter Grice, the Dean of Geraldton since 2015 and vicar-general of the Anglican Diocese of North West Australia, was elected as the 13th Bishop of Rockhampton. He was installed in the position on 27 February 2021.

Structure
Rockhampton is one of 23 dioceses of the Anglican Church of Australia. The diocese covers an area of approximately 57 million hectares, roughly twice the size of New Zealand. The diocese contains nearly the whole central regions of Queensland. The population of the diocese is 216,000 of whom approximately 48,000 indicate that they are Anglicans. The diocese has 20 parishes and ministry districts, with the largest parish bigger than the State of Victoria. The cathedral church of the diocese is St Paul's Cathedral in Rockhampton.

On 18 July 2020, Peter Grice, the Dean of Geraldton since 2015 and vicar-general of the Anglican Diocese of North West Australia, was elected as the 13th Bishop of Rockhampton. He was installed in the position on 27 February 2021.

History 
The diocese was erected in 1892 from the Diocese of Brisbane; its first bishop was Bishop Nathaniel Dawes. The diocese celebrated its centenary in 1992.

Region 
The diocese reaches across central Queensland, between the Diocese of Brisbane to the south and the Diocese of North Queensland to the north. It stretches from the east coast of Australia to the Northern Territory border, with its northern border being a straight line just north of the town of Moranbah and its southern region including the localities of Boyne Island, Biloela, Moura, Tambo and Blackall. Named after its main city of Rockhampton the diocese also includes the cities and towns of Gladstone, Yeppoon, Gracemere, Mt Morgan, Middlemount, Dysart, Blackwater, Springsure, Emerald, Clermont, Barcaldine, Longreach, Winton, Bedourie and Boulia.

Bishops of Rockhampton

Ministries 

Chaplaincies: hospital, correctional centre, police, Mission to Seafarers

Aboriginal and Islander Anglican Ministry: Woorabinda, Murri Wodja

Anglican Regional Ministry

References

External links 
 

Rockhampton
Anglican bishops of Rockhampton
1892 establishments in Australia
Christianity in Queensland
Anglican Church of Australia Ecclesiastical Province of Queensland